Ibn Qulawayh (died in Baghdad, 978 or 979 AD) was a Twelver Shia traditionalist and jurist. He is one of the authoritative traditionalists among the Shia.

Life
His official name was Ibn Qūlawayh (Qūlūya), Abu'l-Qasem Ja'Far b. Moḥammad b. Jaʿfar b. Mūsāb. Qūlawayh Qomī Baḡdādī Abdullah Ashari may have been among his teachers. It seems that he began his education in Qom. He traveled to other places to study the Hadith. He visited Iraq and resided there while he was ill. Many of his teachers were in Iraq such as Ibn Edris Qomi, Ali Ibn Babewayh Qomi, Ibn Valid Qomi, Ibn Oqdah, Abu Omar Kashi, Abdul Aziz Ibn Yahya Jaloudi, Ibn Homam Iskafi and his father Muhammad and his brother Ali.

Transmitters of Hadith
There are some bodies among transmitters of Hadith for Qulawayh like Ibn Abdoon, Ibn Ayyash Johari, Ibn Babawayh, Ibn Shazan Qomi, Ibn Nouh Sirafi, and Haroun Ibn Musa talakbari who are used by Qulawayh. About his reliability, we could say that Shaykh Mofid mentioned him as the reliable transmitter. Also Najasi And Tousi known him as reliable transmitter.

Works
He has many books on the subject of Jurisprudence and Hadith. His most known book is Kamil Al Ziyyarat which is published in Najaf by Abdul Hosein Amini. This book an important source of Imami in Praying. It shows the interest in traditions in that time. Qulawayh narrated many traditions from Muhammad, Imam Kazim and Imam Sadiq and the chains of narrators. Many of his books are not available:
 Al Arbaeen
 History of months and its events
 Praying
 Witness
 Qiyyam Al Layl va Navader

Death
He may be buried in Qom or Kazemayn.

See also
Shaykh Tusi
Al-Shaykh Al-Mufid
Fiqh Jaffaria

References

External links
 Fa.wikishia.net/view/
 Wiki.ahlolbait.com
 Lib.eshia.ir

970s deaths
Year of birth unknown
Year of death uncertain
Place of birth missing
10th-century people from the Abbasid Caliphate
Shia scholars of Islam
People from Qom
People from Baghdad
Iraqi Shia Muslims